The women's 1500 metres at the 2003 All-Africa Games were held on October 13.

Results

References
Results
Results

1500